Voodoo Gods is an American death metal band with a roster of international musicians.

Discography
 Extended plays
Shrunken Head – EP (2008)

 Albums
Anticipation for Blood Leveled in Darkness (July 28, 2014)
The Divinity of Blood (May 15, 2020)

 Music videos
 "Renaissance Of Retribution" (2014)

Members

 Current members
Alex Voodoo – drums 
Seth Van de Loo – vocals  
Jacek Hiro – guitars   
Jean Baudin – bass  
Victor Smolski – guitars  
George "Corpsegrinder" Fisher – vocals  

 Former members
Tony Norman – guitars  
Adam "Nergal" Darski – vocals 
Mike Browning – vocals, percussion
David Shankle – guitars

References

External links
 

Death metal musical groups from Florida
American thrash metal musical groups
Musical groups established in 2001
Musical groups from Tampa, Florida